Nawaf Salam (born 15 December 1953) is a Lebanese diplomat, jurist, and academic. He was elected on 9 November 2017 as judge on the International Court of Justice for the 2018–2027 term, having received a concurrent majority of votes in the United Nations General Assembly and Security Council. He served as Lebanon's Ambassador and Permanent Representative to the United Nations in New York from 2007 to 2017, during which period he held the positions of President of the Security Council and Vice President of the General Assembly.

Background and education
Son of Abdallah Salam and Reckat Beyhum, Nawaf was born into a prominent family from Beirut, Lebanon. His grandfather, Salim Salam, the leader of the "Beirut Reform Movement", was elected deputy of Beirut to the Ottoman parliament in 1912. His uncle, Saeb Salam, fought for Lebanon's independence from the French Mandate of Lebanon and subsequently served four times as Prime Minister of Lebanon between 1952 and 1973. His cousin Tammam Salam was also Prime Minister of Lebanon between 2014 and 2016. He is married to Sahar Baassiri, columnist and Lebanon's Ambassador to UNESCO as of January 2018. He has two sons, Abdallah and Marwan.

Salam received a doctorate in political science from the Institut d'Études Politiques de Paris (Sciences Po) (1992), an LLM from Harvard Law School (1991), a doctorate in history from Sorbonne University (1979)., and a Diploma from the Ecole des Hautes Etudes en Sciences Sociales (1974).

Career

Legal practice and academia

From 1979 to 1981, Salam was a lecturer on the contemporary history of the Middle East at Sorbonne University. In 1981, he left Paris to spend an academic year as a visiting scholar at the Weatherhead Center for International Affairs at Harvard University. Between 1985 and 1989, he was a lecturer at the American University of Beirut, during which time he also practiced law as an associate at Takla Law Firm. He was a visiting researcher at Harvard Law School from 1989 to 1990, and a foreign legal consultant at Edwards & Angell LLP from 1989 to 1992. He resumed his practice at the Takla Law Firm in 1992 as well as his teaching of International Law and International Relations at the American University of Beirut. He was appointed Visiting associate professor of Political Science in 2003, and later associate professor of Political Science in 2005. From 2005 to 2006, he was the Chairman of the Political Studies and Public Administration Department.

Public interest work
Salam served as a member of the Executive Bureau of the Economic and Social Council of Lebanon from 1999 to 2002 and as a member of the Lebanese National Commission of UNESCO from 2000 to 2004. In 2005 and 2006, he was a member and Secretary General of The National Commission on Electoral Reform which was entrusted with the task of preparing the draft of a new electoral law for Lebanon. He has also served on the board of trustees of the Lebanese Center for Policy Studies (LCPS), a non-partisan think tank whose mission is to produce and advocate policies that improve governance in Lebanon and the Arab world. In 1996, he co-founded the Lebanese Association for Democratic Elections (LADE), a non-governmental monitoring organization that works to promote the fair and transparent conduct of parliamentary and municipal elections.

Ambassador of Lebanon to the United Nations
From July 2007 to December 2017, he served as Lebanon's Ambassador and Permanent Representative to the United Nations in New York.

Salam's mandate at the UN was marked by his repeated interventions before the Security Council calling for security and stability in South Lebanon through the implementation of United Nations Security Council Resolution 1701, promoting the policy of "disassociation" from the Syrian conflict, and seeking an end to impunity through the establishment of the Special Tribunal for Lebanon in the matter of the assassination of former Lebanese Prime Minister Rafic Hariri pursuant to United Nations Security Council resolution 1757. He was also a strong advocate of Palestinian National rights, including the right to self-determination and the establishment of an independent Palestinian State.

He represented Lebanon on the Security Council in 2010 and 2011, for Lebanon's two-year term as a non-permanent member. In May 2010 and September 2011, he held the rotating Presidency of the Security Council.

He served as vice-president of the 67th session of the General Assembly of the United Nations from September 2012 to September 2013 and as acting President of the General Assembly of the United Nations in July 2013.

He represented Lebanon on the Economic and Social Council (ECOSOC) in 2016 and 2017.

During his mandate at the United Nations, Salam chaired and participated in many Lebanese delegations to international conferences and meetings, including the Climate Change Summits (Paris 2015 and Copenhagen 2009), the International Conference on Financing for Development (Addis Ababa 2015), and the Rio+20 Summit on Sustainable Development (Rio de Janeiro 2012).

Decorations
Salam was awarded in 2012 the French Legion of Honour (Légion d'honneur) at the rank of Officer (Officier) by President Nicolas Sarkozy.

Notable publications

Salam has written books and articles on political and constitutional reform, electoral law reform, overcoming sectarianism, and fighting corruption and promoting accountability through strengthening the independence of the judiciary and the rule of law. He has also written on the question of citizenship and civil society in the Arab world as well as on the development of international law.

Books and booklets
 Editor and Contributor: Lebanon in the Security Council, 2010-2011 (in Arabic), Dar Al Saqi, Beirut, 2013 
 Editor and Contributor: Le Moyen-Orient à l'Epreuve de l'Irak, Actes-Sud/Sindbad, Paris, 2005. 
 Editor and Contributor: Options for Lebanon, I.B.Tauris, London and New York, 2004.  (Arabic version published by Dar An-Nahar ).
 Co-editor with Theodor Hanf and Contributor: Lebanon in Limbo, Nomos, Baden-Baden, 2003. 
 Co-editor with Fares Sassine, Lebanon. A Century in Pictures (Trilingual English-French-Arabic), Dar An-Nahar, Beirut, 2003. 
 Civil Society in the Arab World: The Historical and Political Dimensions, Islamic Legal Studies Program, Harvard Law School, Occasional Publications, Cambridge, 2002. 
 La condition libanaise. Communautés, citoyen, Etat; suivi de: La citoyenneté en pays d'Islam. Dar An-Nahar, Beirut, 1998. (2nd ed. 2001). 
 Mythes et Politiques au Liban. Trois Essais, Fiches du Monde Arabe, Beirut, 1987.
 Prospects for Lebanon. An Essay on Political Opportunities and Constraints, C.L.S., Oxford, 1987.

Chapters in books and articles in refereed journals
 "Reflections on International Law in Changing Times" in Harvard International Law Journal, 60th Anniversary Keynote Address, Volume 60, Issue 2, 2019.
 "Taif's Dysfunctions and the Need for Constitutional Reform" in Youssef Choueiri, Breaking the Cycle: Civil Wars in Lebanon, Stacey International, London, 2007.
 "Note sur le système confessionnel au Liban" in Abdel-Wahab Bouhdiba (ed.), Mélanges en l'honneur de Dominique Chevallier, Paris-Tunis, 2006, pp. 77–86.
 "The War in Lebanon: its origins and courses" in Peter Molt and Helga Dickow, Comparing Cultures and Conflicts, Baden-Baden, 2006, pp. 290–299.
 "The Emergence of Citizenship in Islamdom" in Arab Law Quarterly, Vol. 12, part 2, 1997, pp. 125–147.
 "Between Repatriation and Resettlement: Palestinian Refugees in Lebanon" in Journal of Palestine Studies, Vol. XXIV/1, n° 93, 1994, pp. 18–27.  (French version in Revue d'Etudes Palestiniennes [53] 1, automne 1994)
 "Is the Exceptio non adimpleti contractus part of Lex Mercatoria?" Co-author with Philip D. O'Neill, Jr. in Emmanuel Gaillard (ed.), Transnational Rules in International Commercial Arbitration, International Chamber of Commerce/International Law Association, Paris, 1993, pp. 147–159.

References

External links
 Official Website
 
 
 YouTube Videos of Permanent Mission of Lebanon to the United Nations
 Harvard Islamic Legal Studies Publication – Civil Society in the Arab World
 Harvard International Law Journal – 60th Anniversary Keynote Address
 Commencement Address to the International College Class of 2014

1953 births
Living people
Harvard Law School alumni
University of Paris alumni
Academic staff of the American University of Beirut
Academic staff of the University of Paris
Permanent Representatives of Lebanon to the United Nations
Nawaf
International Court of Justice judges
Lebanese Sunni Muslims